Nord 2.451 to 2.631 were 0-4-2 locomotives for mixed traffic of the Chemins de Fer du Nord.
The machines were retired from service from 1909 to 1923.

Construction history
The locomotive design was first put into service at the Chemins de Fer du Nord in 1867 and originated from a similar design which was built by Ernest Goüin in 1851 for the Lyon railways and reproduced in large numbers by the Chemins de fer de l'Est, Chemins de fer de l'Ouest and Chemins de fer de Paris à Lyon et à la Méditerranée.

The main difference to these older types was the arrangement of the rear axle, which was supported from the outside in order to leave as much space as possible for the firebox between the wheels. 
The rest of the frame remained inside the driving wheels.
The Stephenson valve gear and the cylinders were on the inside of the locomotive frame.
The firebox was of the Crampton type, the boiler barrel consisted of three shells, with the middle one carrying the dome. 
A Crampton regulator sat behind the chimney, with the steam pipes running down on the outside to the steam chest.

The Nord 2.451 to 2.631 locomotives were built by Société J. F. Cail & Cie and Fives-Lille from 1867 to 1883.

References

Bibliography

External links

 ETH-Bibliothek Zürich, Bildarchiv. Société J. F. Cail & Cie, 1867, Nord 2.478, viewer
 ETH-Bibliothek Zürich, Bildarchiv. Compagnie de Fives-Lille No. 1839, 1871, Nord 2.508, viewer
 ETH-Bibliothek Zürich, Bildarchiv. Compagnie de Fives-Lille No. 1839, 1871, Nord 2.508, viewer
 Steamlocomotive.com : Nord 0-4-2 Locomotives in France

Steam locomotives of France
2.451
0-4-2 locomotives
Railway locomotives introduced in 1867